Becoming is the second album by Ari Koivunen, who won the 2007 Finnish Idols competition. The thirteenth and final track on the album is an acoustic version of "The Evil That Men Do". The song is a cover song from the British heavy metal band Iron Maiden. Ari previously had performed the song during the 2007 Finnish Idols competition, but the album version is an acoustic arrangement and has a slightly altered organization of the lyrics.

Track listing

Personnel
Ari Koivunen – vocals
Erkka Korhonen – guitar
Erkki Silvennoinen – bass
Mauro Gargano – drums
Vili Ollila – keyboards 
Luca Gargano - guitar

References

Ari Koivunen albums
2008 albums